The International Country Gospel Music Association (ICGMA) is the oldest of all Christian country music organizations. ICGMA began in 1957 as the brainchild of Dr. W. Lindsey Thompson and Billy Holcomb. Their goal was to unite and work together with artists not just from a state side vision, but internationally. They felt that by working internationally they could spread the message and the music to a much larger and global audience.

The organization is primarily known as a Texas based company, but has in past years moved their functions to different states. In recent years the awards shows have been held in places such as Canton, Texas and Columbia, Tennessee.

Board of directors
The board of the ICGMA is primarily made up of musicians and business men associated with Christian country music. Past president, Chuck Day is a noted Christian recording artist credited with penning the award winning song, Midnight Cry.

Awards
Much like its contemporaries, the CMA's and the Dove Awards, the ICGMA holds yearly awards shows which honor individuals who have made a significant contribution to the field of Christian country music. The awards are arranged in the very same manner as other music shows which include an entertainer of the year as well as a song of the year category.

Hall of fame inductees
The ICGMA inducts members of the Christian country community that have a proven history in the field of Christian country music. The inductees are chosen and then voted on by the membership of the organization.

References

Is
Music organizations based in the United States